The territory which would later become the state of New York was settled by European colonists as part of the New Netherland colony (parts of present-day New York, New Jersey, Connecticut and Delaware) under the command of the Dutch West India Company in the Seventeenth Century. These colonists were largely of Dutch, Flemish, Walloon, and German stock, but the colony soon became a "melting pot." In 1664, at the onset of the Second Anglo-Dutch War, English forces under Richard Nicolls ousted the Dutch from control of New Netherland, and the territory became part of several different English colonies. Despite one brief year when the Dutch retook the colony (1673–1674), New York would remain an English and later British possession until the American colonies declared independence in 1776.

With the unification of the two proprietary colonies of East Jersey and West Jersey in 1702, the provinces of New York and the neighboring colony New Jersey shared a royal governor.  This arrangement began with the appointment of Queen Anne's cousin, Edward Hyde, Lord Cornbury as Royal Governor of New York and New Jersey in 1702, and ended when New Jersey was granted its own royal governor in 1738.

Dutch Era of New Netherland (1624–1664; 1673–1674)

New Netherland (Dutch: Nieuw-Nederland) was the 17th-century colonial province of the Republic of the Seven United Netherlands and the Dutch West India Company. It claimed territories along the eastern coast of North America from the Delmarva Peninsula to southwestern Cape Cod.  Settled areas of New Netherland are now constitute the states of  New York, New Jersey, Delaware, and Connecticut, and parts of Pennsylvania and Rhode Island. The provincial capital New Amsterdam was located at the southern tip of the island of Manhattan at Upper New York Bay.

New Netherland was conceived as a private business venture to exploit the North American fur trade. By the 1650s, the colony experienced dramatic growth and became a major port for trade in the North Atlantic. The leader of the Dutch colony was known by the title Director or Director-General. On August 27, 1664, four English frigates commanded by Richard Nicolls sailed into New Amsterdam's harbor and demanded the surrender of New Netherland.  This event sparked the Second Anglo-Dutch War, which led to the transfer of the territory to England per the Treaty of Breda.

Restoration of the colony, 1673–1674
In 1673, during the Third Anglo-Dutch War, the Dutch were able to recapture New Amsterdam (renamed "New York" by the British) under Admiral Cornelis Evertsen the Youngest and Captain Anthony Colve.  Evertsen renamed the city "New Orange." Evertsen returned to the Netherlands in July 1674, and was accused of disobeying his orders. Evertsen had been instructed not to retake New Amsterdam but instead to conquer the British colonies of Saint Helena and Cayenne (now French Guiana). In 1674, the Dutch were compelled to relinquish New Amsterdam to the British under the terms of the Second Treaty of Westminster.

Under British control (1664–1673; 1674–1783)
Apart from a short period between May 1688 and April 1689, during which New York was part of the Dominion of New England, the territory was known in this period as the Province of New York.

See also
 For a list of governors of New York state after independence (1777–present), see: List of governors of New York.
Director-General of New Netherland, for a list of the Governors of New Netherland from 1624 to 1664.
List of colonial governors of New Jersey

Bibliography
Paterson, David "Black, Blind, & In Charge: A Story of Visionary Leadership and Overcoming Adversity."Skyhorse Publishing. New York, New York, 2020

References

External links
 Colonial Governors of New York

Lists of American colonial governors